The St. Pete/Clearwater Elite Invitational is a preseason college softball event that takes place in middle of February of each year, at the Eddie C. Moore Complex in Clearwater, Florida.

Year-by-year

2019

Teams
Sources:
California
Florida Atlantic
Florida State
Hofstra
James Madison
Kentucky
LSU
Minnesota
Notre Dame
Ohio State
Oklahoma
Oklahoma State
Oregon
Tennessee
Texas
Utah

Team records at the 2019 Invite

2020

Teams
Sources:
Alabama
Florida State
Georgia
James Madison
Kansas
Liberty
Minnesota
Missouri
Northwestern
Oklahoma State
South Carolina
South Florida
Texas Tech
UCLA
Virginia Tech
Washington

Team records at the 2020 Invite

Appearances by team

References

External links
St. Pete/Clearwater Elite Invitational

College softball competitions in the United States
Sports competitions in Florida
2019 establishments in Florida
Recurring sporting events established in 2019
Softball in Florida
Sports in Clearwater, Florida